Blue Mound is a village in Macon County, Illinois, United States. The population was 1,133 at the 2020 census. It is included in the Decatur, Illinois Metropolitan Statistical Area.

Geography
Blue Mound is located in southwestern Macon County at  (39.699677, -89.122075). Illinois Route 48 passes through the village, leading northeast  to Decatur, the county seat, and southwest the same distance to Taylorville.

Surrounded by the Griswold Conservation Area, park and camping place, the mound is estimated to date from about 130,000 years ago in geologic time from melting of glacier ice. It is one of a group of glacial mounds in the Blue Mound area.

Demographics

As of the census of 2000, there were 1,129 people, 459 households, and 329 families residing in the village. The racial makeup of the village was 99.65% White, 0.18% Native American, 0.09% from other races, and 0.09% from two or more races. Hispanic or Latino of any race were 0.27% of the population.

There were 459 households, out of which 34.0% had children under the age of 18 living with them, 56.0% were married couples living together, 11.1% had a female householder with no husband present, and 28.3% were non-families. 24.6% of all households were made up of individuals, and 15.0% had someone living alone who was 65 years of age or older. The average household size was 2.46 and the average family size was 2.91.

In the village, the population was spread out, with 25.2% under the age of 18, 8.9% from 18 to 24, 28.8% from 25 to 44, 20.7% from 45 to 64, and 16.4% who were 65 years of age or older. The median age was 36 years. For every 100 females, there were 90.7 males. For every 100 females age 18 and over, there were 90.3 males.

The median income for a household in the village was $44,018, and the median income for a family was $49,432. Males had a median income of $36,354 versus $21,081 for females. The per capita income for the village was $20,039. About 2.7% of families and 4.2% of the population were below the poverty line, including 6.2% of those under age 18 and 4.0% of those age 65 or over.

See also

 List of municipalities in Illinois

References

External links

Villages in Macon County, Illinois
Villages in Illinois